Glasgow Baillieston was a constituency of the Scottish Parliament (Holyrood). It elected one Member of the Scottish Parliament (MSP) by the plurality (first past the post) method of election. The seat was represented by Labour's Margaret Curran from the inception of the Scottish Parliament in 1999 until her retirement in 2011.

For the 2011 Scottish Parliament election, the constituency was abolished. The Baillieston electoral ward was divided between Provan and Shettleston seats.

Electoral region

Constituency boundaries 

The current Glasgow Baillieston constituency was created at the same time as the Scottish Parliament, in 1999, with the name and boundaries of an  existing Westminster constituency. In 2005, however, Scottish Westminster (House of Commons) constituencies were mostly replaced with new constituencies.

The Holyrood constituency was entirely within the Glasgow City council area, on the area's eastern boundary. It was east of the Shettleston and Springburn constituencies and north of the Rutherglen constituency. Shettleston and Springburn were also entirely within the city area. Rutherglen straddles the boundary between the Glasgow City and South Lanarkshire council areas.

Boundary review 

Following their First Periodic review of constituencies to the Scottish Parliament the Boundary Commission for Scotland recommended the abolition of the Baillieston constituency. The Garrowhill, Bailliston, Swinton, and Barlanark areas of the Baillieston electoral area were combined with Calton and Shettleston, to form an enlarged  Glasgow Shettleston constituency, whilst the East Centre, North East, and remaining areas of the Baillieston ward form a newly created Glasgow Provan constituency.

Constituency profile 

The constituency included the areas of Ballieston, Mount Vernon, Easterhouse, Barlanark and Gartloch. It is industrial in character and has high levels of unemployment, one-parent families and drug abuse.

Member of the Scottish Parliament

Election results 

 
 

 
 
 
 
 

 

 
 
 
 
 ,

See also
 Politics of Glasgow

Notes 

Scottish Parliament constituencies and regions 1999–2011
Politics of Glasgow
1999 establishments in Scotland
Constituencies established in 1999
2011 disestablishments in Scotland
Constituencies disestablished in 2011
Baillieston